Cossall   is a village and civil parish  east of Ilkeston in Nottinghamshire, England. The 2001 Census recorded a parish population of 612, reducing slightly to 606 at the 2011 Census. There is also a ward of Broxtowe Council called Cossall and Kimberley. The population is listed under Kimberley.  North of the hamlet is a slag heap formed of tons of waste extracted from local coal mines.

See also
St Catherine's Church, Cossall
Willoughby Almshouses

References

Further reading

External links

Villages in Nottinghamshire
Places in the Borough of Broxtowe
Civil parishes in Nottinghamshire